Bronwyn Nanette Curtis  is a British Australian Economist with focuses onFinance, Economics and Media sectors. She has held positions such as the Head of Global Research at HSBC Bank, Chief Economist at Nomura International, Managing Editor and Head of European Broadcast at Bloomberg LP and Senior Economist/Bond Strategist with Deutsche Bank Group. Until recently, Bronwyn Curtis served as the Governor for the London School of Economics (LSE). In 2008, she received the OBE (Order of the British Empire) award for outstanding service to business economics and in 2017 received an honorary doctorate from her alma mater (La Trobe University). Bronwyn currently serves on a number of committees and is frequently called upon to speak at various conferences on matters relating to trade and finance.

Biography
Born Bronwyn Nannette Schlotterlein in Bendigo, Victoria in Australia, studied ballet at the Australian Ballet School after getting her high school diploma. She received her undergraduate degree in Economics with Honors at La Trobe University in1969. and a Masters in Economics from the London School of Economics in 1974. Curtis later married (is currently widowed) and has two children. Her hobbies include yacht racing/cruising and ballet.

Career

Curtis has an expansive career in both Finance and Media and has held various positions with both executive and non-executive titles. After receiving her master's degree from LSE, she worked as a consultant for the World Bank and the United Nations Conference on Trade and Development (UNCTAD). Here she focused on projects situated in West Africa, Asia and the Caribbean. In her early career,  she also held senior positions with Commodities Research Unit, Masterfoods (M&M Mars) and Gill & Duffus.

In 1987 Curtis took a position with Deutsche Bank Group, becoming Global Head of Currency & Fixed Income Strategy in 1995. She then moved to Nomura International in 1996 as the Chief Economist. In 1999, she made a career shift into media by taking on the position of Head of European Broadcast and Managing Editor for Bloomberg LP.  In 2008, she returned to the financial sector, taking a position with HSBC Bank place initially as the Head of Global Research, later being promoted to Senior Advisor for Global Banking and Markets as well as Executive Editor for Global Communications.

Some of the non-executive roles/ affiliations that Curtis has taken on include:

Selected literature

G8’s role in the new millennium: Ch 8 (1999) 

Bronwyn Curtis writes a chapter in Michael Hodges book on the role of the G8 (Group of Eight) in the new millennium where she focuses on 'Promoting Growth in the World Economy'. She starts off by looking historically at what has happened in financial markets that has encouraged political parties to legislate unpopular but needed policies for their economy. She derives that instances for change arrive out of necessity and are spurred on by crises of a large nature. In looking at how the political structures are set up in democracies, Curtis makes mention of the fact that because the effects of policies can take time for their effects to be realized in the economy, many politicians may operate on a 'short-term' basis where politics now plays an important role in whether a government will opt to place a policy in motion or not. She moves on to look at what has transpired in the US and UK markets mainly and categorizes the pre-1980's as ruled by the boom and bust cycle in economics. This volatility in the market required the labor force to be flexible enough for people to move in accordance with the changes in the needs of the economy (i.e. the market). The 1990s introduced more stability in the cyclical movements of the markets and as a result, institutions became more reliable, which in turn according to Bronwyn Curtis, led the fluctuations in the market to be manipulated by changes in expectations. To tie this analysis to her topic, Curtis now makes the connection between changes in expectations impacting the market to the need for reliable policies. As an example, the case of the Bank of England stating independence from the government is introduced to look at how trust in the policies implemented by the bank and their commitment to said policies affected expectations and economic growth.

In a slight shift in topic, Bronwyn Curtis shifts her focus from trust in institutions to her thoughts on Euroland and the adoption of the European Central Bank (as well as the adoption of the Euro across participating nation states across Europe). She brings up the worry that having participating nations each operating at different economic speeds brings up a disconnect if the policies implemented by the European Central Bank are to be the same across board. What this means is that a country like Italy, who might operate best with higher interest rates will be working with a country like France who might benefit from low and stable interest rates. She also brings up the fact that a small number of member countries in Euroland account for 2/3 of the total GDP for Euroland and yet each country will have 1 vote in the council. This will in turn lead the larger countries to bail out smaller countries who are in need at the cost of their individual growth for the stability of the collective.

The 3 main conclusions from this chapter hold that first, the policies that are needed for economic growth and usually not easy for the governments in power to enforce and as such will need to be spurred on by changes in the financial markets that lead to unrest with the society. Second is that change is not undertaken voluntarily, and that similar to the first main point, a large enough crisis is necessary to spur on the demand for change. Lastly, that the way that the Economic and Monetary Union (EMU) in Europe has been designed, will eventually lead to tension between nation states and will eventually dissolve.

Publications 

 Bronwyn Curtis (Book) - Cocoa: A guide to trade practices - International Trade Centre, UNCTAD, WTO 
Bronwyn Curtis (Article)- A History Lesson For Today's Eurofederalists - WSJ 
 Bronwyn Curtis (Article)- Asia's Trojan Gift for Europe - WSJ 
Bronwyn Curtis (Article) - Anti-Federalists And Euroskeptics - WSJ 
Bronwyn Curtis (Article) - Autumn Statement: An economist's view  - Financial Times
Bronwyn Curtis (Article) - Economists' views on the budget - Financial Times 
Bronwyn Curtis (Article) - Eurolessons for Washington

Conferences and press coverage 

 Speaker and moderator at OECD 2004 Forum on 'Health of Nations'  
On panel of speakers for IATA event regarding the airline industry and global markets 
On panel of speakers at LSE on 'How the UK can improve productivity and still build their workforce' 
Appointed as Chief Economic Adviser of Official Monetary and Financial Institutions Forum (OMFIF) 
Featured in WSJ Article on 'U.K. Statistics Office's Report on GDP Fuels Pessimism About British Economy' 
Quoted in WSJ Article on 
'As Odds Improve for EMU, France May Vote the Course' 
'Dollar Roars by Milestone And Traders Expect More' 
'Traders Test Limits Of Dollar's Rebound' 
'Investors Are Swiftly Flocking To the Safest Asset of All: Cash' 
Interviewed on BBC News

Awards 

 Appointed OBE (Order of the British Empire) in 2008 for outstanding services to business economics 
 Doctor of Letters in 2017 from La Trobe University 
 Recipient of a 'European Women of Achievement' Award

References  

Living people
Year of birth missing (living people)
Alumni of the London School of Economics
Officers of the Order of the British Empire
British women economists
Australian women economists
20th-century Australian  economists
21st-century British  economists
People from Victoria (Australia)
La Trobe University alumni